Flying Tiger Line Flight 739 was a Lockheed L-1049 Super Constellation propliner chartered by the United States military that disappeared on March 16, 1962, over the Western Pacific Ocean. The aircraft was transporting 93 U.S. soldiers and three South Vietnamese from Travis Air Force Base, California to Saigon, Vietnam. After refueling at Andersen Air Force Base, Guam, the Super Constellation was en route to Clark Air Base in the Philippines when it disappeared. All 107 aboard were declared missing and presumed dead.

The airliner's disappearance prompted one of the largest air and sea searches in the history of the Pacific. Aircraft and surface ships from four branches of the U.S. military searched more than  during the course of eight days. A civilian tanker observed what appeared to be an in-flight explosion believed to be the missing Super Constellation, though no trace of wreckage or debris was ever recovered. The Civil Aeronautics Board determined that, based on the tanker's observations, Flight 739 probably exploded in-flight, though an exact cause could not be determined without examining the remnants of the aircraft. This was the deadliest aviation accident involving the Lockheed Constellation.

Flight 
The aircraft was a 5-year-old Lockheed L-1049H Super Constellation with 17,224 airframe hours. It carried 11 American civilian crew members and 96 military passengers. The flight was operated by the Flying Tiger Line as Military Air Transport Service (MATS) Charter flight 739.

The Super Constellation carried 93 Ranger-trained Army communications specialists en route to South Vietnam. Their orders were to relieve soldiers in Saigon who had been training Vietnamese troops to fight Viet Cong guerrillas. Also on board were three members of the Vietnamese military. The flight crew consisted of eleven civilians based out of California, including seven men. The pilot was Captain Gregory P. Thomas.

The flight departed Travis Air Force Base, California, at 05:45 GMT, on March 14, 1962, and was destined for Saigon. There were four planned refueling stops: Honolulu, Hawaii; Wake Island; Guam; and Clark Air Base, Philippines. The flight arrived at Guam at 11:14 GMT, on March 15, after being delayed for minor maintenance on engines numbers 1 and 3 at Honolulu, and later at Wake Island. The aircraft departed from Guam at 12:57 GMT with an estimated time of arrival at the Philippines at 19:16 GMT.

The aircraft was expected to reach  at 15:30. At that time, the Guam IFSS experienced temporary communication difficulties with heavy radio static. At 15:39 the Guam radio operator attempted to contact the flight for a position report but was unable to establish contact. The aircraft was not seen or heard from again.

Investigation 
The Clark Field Rescue Coordinating Center declared the aircraft missing the morning of March 16, 1962. Navy officials reported that they believed that the aircraft had crashed closer to Guam than the Philippines. At the time of the disappearance, the weather was clear and the sea calm. The Navy, Air Force, Coast Guard, and Marines ordered aircraft and ships to the area.

The first day of searching continued overnight. During the first two days of the search, vessels crisscrossed  of ocean. Secretary of the Army Elvis Stahr told newspapers that "we have not given up hope that it will be found and that those aboard are safe," and that a "maximum effort" was being made. After four days of searching, Major General Theodore R. Milton of the 13th Air Force told newspapers that although the chance of finding survivors was doubtful, every effort would be made "as long as there is any hope at all."

Search efforts included aircraft from Guam, Clark Field, the US 7th Fleet, and the Air Force at Okinawa. Additionally surface ships and aircraft from numerous U.S. bases in the western Pacific contributed to the search efforts.

After eight days, the search was called off.

Conspiracy theories 
Flight 739 was one of two Flying Tiger Line flights with military connections that were destroyed under similar circumstances on the same day. This led both airline officials and the media to offer suggestions of sabotage and conspiracy.

Both Flight 739 and the other aircraft, an L-1049 Super Constellation, departed from Travis Air Force Base at around 09:45 PST on Wednesday, March 14, 1962, and both encountered difficulties several hours later. The other aircraft was carrying "secret military cargo" when it crashed in the Aleutian Islands and caught fire.

Flying Tiger Lines released a statement outlining some possible reasons for the two occurrences, including sabotage of either or both aircraft, and kidnapping of Flight 739 and its passengers. The airline also said that these were merely "wild guesses" and that there was no evidence to support either theory.

Possibility of sabotage 
A Liberian tanker, the SS T L Linzen, reported seeing a bright light in the sky near the aircraft's expected position about 90 minutes after the last radio contact. U.S. military officials described it as being a "bright light strong enough to light a ship's decks".

A Civil Aeronautics Board investigation determined that witnesses aboard the tanker also observed what appeared to be vapor trails, and numerous crewmen observed the two fireballs fall into the ocean. The tanker proceeded to the location where the fireballs had been observed to fall into the ocean but was unable to find any trace of the falling objects during their six-hour search. A spokesman at the rescue effort headquarters in Guam said that as time passed with no sign of the aircraft, "more credence is given to the possibility that the tanker may have seen the missing aircraft explode in flight."

Officials with the Flying Tiger Line said that their earlier theories of sabotage would be bolstered were the investigation to reveal that an explosion had occurred. The executive vice president of operations said that experts considered it impossible for explosions to occur on the Super-Constellation in the course of normal operation. Additionally he claimed that there was nothing powerful enough aboard the aircraft to completely blow it apart, and that "something violent must have happened."

The Civil Aeronautics Board determined that, given the observations of the tanker crew, the flight most likely exploded in midair. As no part of the wreckage was ever found, the CAB was unable to establish a determination of cause. The accident report concluded:

See also

 Aviation safety
 List of accidents and incidents involving commercial aircraft
Other similar incidents and accidents
 1990 Faucett Perú 727 disappearance
 2003 Boeing 727-223 disappearance
 Adam Air Flight 574
 Air France Flight 447
 Arrow Air Flight 1285R – another disaster involving US troop transport
 Indonesia AirAsia Flight 8501
 Malaysia Airlines Flight 370
 Varig Flight 967

References

External links
 Listing on Vietnam Wall sought for troops killed in 1962 plane crash 

Accidents and incidents involving the Lockheed Constellation
Airliner accidents and incidents with an unknown cause
Aviation accidents and incidents in 1962
Aviation accidents and incidents in the Pacific Ocean
Missing aircraft
Flying Tiger Line accidents and incidents
March 1962 events in Oceania
Military logistics of the Vietnam War